The steamboat Skanderbeg was used for transport of the goods and passengers mostly on the Skadar Lake in Montenegro in the first half of the 20th century. It was built in Trieste in 1914 or 1916. Skanderbeg'''s first owner was Lloyd's office in Trieste (then in Austria-Hungary). The ownership over Skanderbeg was transferred to Lloyd's office in Shkoder (its agent Tef Curani). When Italy took control over Trieste the ownership was transferred to Lloyd Triestino in Trieste. In 1924 Yugoslav a shipping company from Cetinje bought Skanderbeg to use it for transport of the goods and passengers over the Skadar Lake. Its route was between Rijeka Crnojevića and Shkoder. In April 1941, after the Axis occupied Yugoslavia during the Second World War, Skanderbeg was confiscated by Italians, together with all boats on Skadar Lake. On 12 February 1942 Skanderbeg was captured and sunk by Yugoslav Partisans who scuttled it.

Skanderbeg had a crew of 6 people. Its displacement was 31 t (light) or 41 t (loaded).

 History 
According to Dinko Franetović, Skanderbeg was completed in 1916 in Trieste, Italy (then Austria-Hungary). It was first owned by Lloyd in Trieste (then Austria-Hungary), Lloyd's agent in Shkoder (Tef Curani) and by Lloyd Triestino in Italian-held Trieste. In 1924 Skanderbeg was bought by Jadransko-Skadarska Plovidba, founded in Cetinje by Serbian-Albanian bank in 1920. Its seat was in Lipovik (port near Rijeka Crnojevića). Skanderbeg was used for transport of goods and passengers between Rijeka Crnojevića and Shkoder. In April 1941 all boats of Jadransko-Skadarska Plovidba were confiscated by the Italians who occupied this part of the Kingdom of Yugoslavia.

On 12 February 1942 Yugoslav Partisans ("Carev Laz" battalion of Lovćen detachment and part of battalion "13 July") attacked Skanderbeg while it was sailing on the Skadar Lake, at the mouth of Rijeka Crnojevića. Partisans killed 3 Italian soldiers and took remaining 9 as prisoners. They also released from captivity fifteen prisoners who were transported by Skanderbeg. One prisoner was killed in the attack. Partisans sank Skanderbeg by scuttling it, without causing its damage. The wreck can be seen from the surface during the low water level.

References

External links 
 Skanderbeg on "Nacionalni parkovi" website

Steamboats in Europe
Ships built in Trieste